Anglesea is a town in Victoria, Australia. It is located on the Great Ocean Road in the Surf Coast Shire local government area.

Originally known as Swampy Creek, the area's name was changed to Anglesea River in 1884 when the township was established. A Post Office under that name opened on 16 April 1886. and was renamed Anglesea in 1950. The name derives from Anglesey, an island in North Wales.
 
Alcoa of Australia operated a power station and open-cut coal mine near the town from 1969 until August 2015. The site is now the subject of restorative work.

In February 1983, the Ash Wednesday fires swept through the area, destroying many houses.

Tourism

There is a surge in population during the summer months, reaching a peak around Christmas and New Year's Eve, as many Melbourne residents arrive for the holiday season. Although the town's main beach usually has reasonable surfing conditions, many surfers opt for the beach known as "Guvvo's", just west of town at the end of O'Donohue Road. Anglesea is also well known locally for its regular riverbank markets, which are held by the river on Anglesea's main street, the Great Ocean Road.

The town's golf-course is renowned for its resident population of eastern grey kangaroos which graze on the fairways. In September the town hosts the Angair Wildflower Festival.

The Surf Coast Walk passes through the town and can either be followed north-east along the coastline to Torquay or south-east towards Aireys Inlet and Moggs Creek.

Point Roadknight, Point Addis and Harvey Street are some of the tourist attractions along with several parks which surround the coastline. The Coogoorah Park is located towards the end of the River Reserve Road which boasts of a network of islands connected by boardwalks and bridges through wetlands.

Sport
Anglesea has an Australian Rules football team and Netball Club that both compete in the Bellarine Football League.

The town is also home of the Anglesea Cricket Club which competes in the Bellarine Peninsula Cricket Association.

Golfers play at the Anglesea Golf Club on Noble Street, home to a great many kangaroos.

Anglesea has a recently re-built skateboard ramp which has led a controversial life, with the construction material having changed from wood to steel, and then concrete.

The area has a variety of surfing locations that cater to both beginners and experienced surfers. Both the patrolled main beach and the sheltered beach at Point Roadknight provide a perfect surfing environment for beginners. More experienced and adventurous surfers can tackle the more exposed beaches to the north and south of the town, or several offshore reefs, which are accessible via boat or a lengthy paddle from shore. These "bombies" can produce challenging waves during large swells.

See also
 Geshe Sonam Thargye - Buddhist centre

References

External links
Australian Places - Anglesea
Official Great Ocean Road Info
Anglesea - Official government tourism site
Anglesea Visitor Information - Anglesea.com.au
Anglesea Community website - www.anglesea.community

Towns in Victoria (Australia)
Surf Coast Shire
Coastal towns in Victoria (Australia)